Prince Abyssinia Akweke Nwafor Orizu  (17 July 1914 – 1999) was a Nigerian of Igbo origin who served as President of the Nigerian Senate from 1963 to 15 January 1966, during the Nigerian First Republic. Orizu was also Acting President of Nigeria from late 1965 until the military coup of January 1966. He was a member of the Nnewi Royal family. His nephew Igwe Kenneth Onyeneke Orizu III is the current Igwe (King) of Nnewi Kingdom. Nwafor Orizu College of Education in Nsugbe, Anambra State, is named after him.

Background

Orizu was born in 1914 into the royal house of Nnewi, Anambra State, in southeast Nigeria, a son of Eze Ugbonyamba, Igwe Orizu I. Orizu went to the United States in 1939, earning a degree in government at Ohio State University and an M.A. degree at Columbia University.
He was an advocate of the "horizontal", broad system of American education, as opposed to the narrow "perpendicular" British system, and earned the nickname "Orizontal", a play on his name and a reference to his constant discussion of the theme.
As discussed in his 1944 book, Without Bitterness, he was a passionate advocate of introducing the American system to Nigeria.
He established The American Council on African Education (ACAE), which obtained numerous tuition scholarships from American sources for the benefit of African students.

Around 1949, Orizu bought the Enitona High School and Enitona printing press from a supporter for only £500, which he borrowed. Another supporter sold him a luxury bus on an installment plan. He established a newspaper known as The West Africa Examiner and became the managing director, while M. C. K. Ajuluchukwu was the editor.
Orizu went to Enugu to console the striking miners after the shooting of 21 miners on 18 November 1949.
Possibly in reaction to a fiery speech that he made there, the British colonial authorities sentenced him to seven years in jail for allegedly misappropriating the funds of the ACAE. But later Roy Wilkins, chairman of ACAE in the US, wrote a letter to Nnamdi Azikiwe ("Zik") exonerating Dr Nwafor Orizu of any financial impropriety.

Prison sentence
In September 1953, Orizu was convicted by a Nigerian magistrate on seven counts of fraud and theft of funds intended for student scholarships at American universities. He was later subsequently sentenced to seven years in prison.

Political career

Orizu ran successfully for election as an independent candidate to represent Onitsha Division, and became the chief whip in the Eastern House of Assembly. Later he joined with other independent candidates to form the National Council of Nigeria and Cameroon (NCNC).
He played a central role in helping Zik become premier of the Eastern Region, using his influence in the NCNC to persuade Professor Eyo Ita to resign as premier of the Region. Zik appointed Orizu the minister of local Government.

Military coup

The President of Nigeria, Nnamdi Azikiwe left the country in late 1965 first for Europe, then on a cruise to the Caribbean. Under the law, Orizu became Acting President during his absence and had all the powers of the President.

A coup was launched on 16 January 1966 by a group of disaffected young military officers led by Major Chukwuma Kaduna Nzeogwu. The army quickly suppressed the revolt but assumed power when it was evident that key politicians had been eliminated, including Prime Minister Abubakar Tafawa Balewa, Premier of Northern Region Sir Ahmadu Bello and Premier of the Western Region, Chief Samuel Ladoke Akintola.
Orizu made a nationwide broadcast, after he had briefed Dr. Nnamdi Azikiwe on the phone on the decision of the cabinet, announcing the cabinet's "voluntary" decision to transfer power to the armed forces. Major General Johnson Aguiyi-Ironsi then made his own broadcast, accepting the "invitation". 
On 17 January, Major General Ironsi established the Supreme Military Council in Lagos and effectively suspended the constitution.

Later career

After the coup, Orizu faded from the political scene but remained active in education. Prior to the civil war, he had set up a high school in 1950, the Nigerian Secondary School, in Nnewi. He remained its proprietor until the state government took over all the schools after the defeat of Biafra. After that he continued as a teacher and an educator, publishing several books. Also, between 1974 and 1975, the government of the defunct East Central State, led by Dr. Ukpabi Asika, appointed him the Chairman of the State's Teachers' Service Commission in Enugu.

Bibliography

References

1915 births
1999 deaths
People from Anambra State
Columbia University alumni
Igbo politicians
Presidents of the Senate (Nigeria)
People from Nnewi
20th-century Nigerian politicians
Igbo royalty
Newspaper founders
People from colonial Nigeria